Patrick Harand (born 15 March 1984 in Vienna) is an Austrian professional ice hockey player who is currently with Union EC Wien of the Austrian fourth tier (Aut.4). He predominately played in the Austrian Hockey League (EBEL/ICEHL). He participated at the 2011 IIHF World Championship as a member of the Austria men's national ice hockey team. He joined KAC from the Graz 99ers as a free agent on 5 April 2012.

References

External links

1984 births
Austrian ice hockey forwards
Graz 99ers players
EC KAC players
Living people
EHC Lustenau players
EC Red Bull Salzburg players
Vienna Capitals players